{{Infobox football club
| clubname = CR Belouizdad
| image = CR_Belouizdad_logo.svg
| fullname = Chabab Riadhi de Belouizdadالشباب الرياضي لبلوزداد
| nickname = *The Great ChababThe Chababists
The RedsThe Belouizdadis
The Belcourtois
| founded = as Chabab Riadhi de Belcourt
| ground = 20 August 1955 Stadium
| capacity = 20,000
| owner = MADAR Holding
| chrtitle = President
| chairman = Mehdi Rabehi
| mgrtitle = Head Coach
| manager  = Nabil Kouki
| league   = Ligue Professionnelle 1
| season   = 2021–22
| position = Ligue Professionnelle 1, 1st (champions)
| current  = 2022–23 CR Belouizdad season
| website  = https://crb.dz/
| pattern_la1 = 
| pattern_b1 = _CRB20h
| pattern_ra1 = 
| pattern_sh1 = _CRB20h
| pattern_so1 = _CRB20h
| leftarm1 = FFFFFF
| body1 = FFFFFF
| rightarm1 = FFFFFF
| shorts1 = FFFFFF
| socks1 = FFFFFF
| pattern_la2 = 
| pattern_b2 = _CRB20a
| pattern_ra2 = 
| pattern_sh2 = _CRB20a
| pattern_so2 = _3_stripes_white
| leftarm2 = F00000
| body2 = FFFFFF
| rightarm2 = F00000
| shorts2 = FFFFFF
| socks2 = F00000
}}Chabab Riadhi de Belouizdad S.s.p.a (Classical Arabic: الشّباب الرّياضيّ لبلوزداد, English Translation: Sporting Youth of Belouizdad), known as Chabab Belouizdad or CR Belouizdad or simply CRB for short, is an Algerian association football club based in Algiers, Algeria, that plays in the Ligue Professionnelle 1, the top flight of Algerian football. The club has competed in the top division for a record 55 seasons (playing just one season in the second tier in 1988–1989). 

CRB was founded on 15 July 1962, ten days after the independence of Algeria, as Chabab Riadhi de Belcourt, by the merger of two clubs from the same district, the Widad Riadhi de Belcourt and the Club Athéltique de Belcourt, and has played at its current home ground, the 20 August 1955 Stadium, ever since.

CRB has traditionally worn a white home kit with the red trademark "V" on the front since inception.

CRB has produced several notable players and established itself as a major force in both Algerian and Maghrebin football during the 1960s and 1970s, winning 10 major trophies in 8 seasons.

The Grand Chabab is one of the most successful clubs in Algeria, having won the domestic league title eight times, the Algerian Cup eight times, one Algerian League Cup, two Algerian Super Cups and the Maghreb Champions Cup a record three times but unfortunately no african title.

In 2010, the White and Reds obtained professional status following a reform of the league to professionalize the Algerian football. They won their first title of champion of Algeria at the end of the 1964–1965 season, three years after their creation.

Madar Holding Group is, since 15 October 2018, the majority shareholder of the share capital of the sports company by shares CRB "Athletic", after acquiring 67% of the 75% of the shares held by the amateur sports Club (CSA), chaired by Karim Chettouf. The board of directors is, since 22 September 2021, chaired by Mohamed Belhadj, replacing Mohamed Abrouk (who held this post after Charaf-Eddine Amara was elected President of the Algerian Football Federation on 16 April 2021), and will have a purely administrative mission, since it was agreed that everything related to the sport component will be managed by the new director general, Hocine Yahi, who agreed to hold this position on 30 March 2021, replacing Toufik Korichi. The first team is managed by Marcos Paquetá since 23 September 2021, replacing Zoran Manojlović.

The club is still and has long been one of the most popular football teams in Algeria, and has local rivalries with neighbors MC Algiers, NA Hussein Dey and USM Algiers.

History
The club was founded in 1962 (following the independence of Algeria). It was born out of a merger of two former clubs from the same district;  'Widad Riadhi Belcourt'  (former club of the rue de Lyon) and the  'Athletic Club de Belcourt' . These two former clubs were known for playing football competitions in the French colonial era, and both were affiliated to the  'FFFA'  (French Football Federation) and the  'FLOT' '(Algiers Ligue de Football Association).

1963–1972: The great Chabab
CRB is a club that has done well in Algerian football from the beginning of its creation, particularly during the period between 1963 and 1972. This period saw Chabab break records so far unparalleled, beginning with winning 10 titles during 8 seasons. Players wore the famous red and white colours which were worn by the best players in Algeria or Africa and also constituted the pillars of the national team of Algeria. Among the players we cite as examples are Lalmas (who was chosen as the best Algerian player of all time after a survey conducted by the Echibek sports weekly in 1993 including votes from more than 350 technical people from Algerian coaches to players), Kalem, Achour, Selmi and not to mention all the others.

With Mr Boukida Djeloul as chairman, and under the leadership of Yahia Saâdi as coach, the goal of the first season in the championship (1962–63) was the adaptation of the team and group cohesion. In this season, the CRB was in the group of Bologhine and Bousmail and was content to win a place allowing it to participate in the centre of the championship.

Second period
This period for CRB had the attention and admiration of all belcourtois and the inhabitants of the surrounding neighbourhoods, to the point where everyone participated in the club to raise funds. This especially involved the big traders of the time; Boukida gentlemen, Bouhelal and Khemissa among others and whose contribution was considered wide and generous, in order to offer the club a means for its policy.

Third Period
After collecting the necessary funds, club leaders began the recruitment process. Targeted recruitment and quality resulting in the arrival of experienced and promising players such as (Zitouni, Paris Club), (Madani and Djemaâ USM Alger), (Zerar Hamam El-Enf, Tunisia), (Nassou and Amar Ain Beniane), (Koussim ES Setif), (Achour and Lalmas OM Ruisseau) and (Kalem IR Hussein-Dey). It is important to acknowledge the way and the work of the leaders of that time: the men in the noblest sense of the term and which were animated only by the love of the club and who sacrificed themselves for it so that it becomes not only a great club, but the biggest club Algeria.

At first, the results of the team were just average, with defeats against MC Oran (3–2), Batna (1–0), Constantine (1–0), Sidon (2–1) and MCA (2–1). The following season, in 1965–1966, CRB woke up and crushed everyone in its path. They made a spectacular comeback, moving from last place to first, after a good series of 9 consecutive victories starting with a victory against ASM Oran (0–1) during the 14th day and overwhelming wins (8–1), (8–0) and (4–1) respectively against MO Constantine on 20 August (halftime 0–1 for Constantine), Annaba and ES Mostaganem.

1965–1966: The phenomenal season CRB
Lined with Prime Algeria, Chabab collected victories this season (16 wins) with big scores (0–4) in Blida and Oran to the MCO and 5–2 before the NAHD with a percussive attack that also called the Machine Gun Attack and had, to their credit, 63 goals this season: (Lalmas 18 goals, Chanane 14, Kalem 13 and Achour 8), making 53 goals amongst themselves. The CRB also won their first cup of Algeria against RC Kouba (final score 3–1).

The 1966–1967 season was just average for Chabab and the 67–68 season was not any better than the last, despite the recruitment of Selmi Djilali. This small decline was due to unfortunate circumstances as 9 Chabab players participated with the national team who took part in the CAN 1968 tournament in Ethiopia. This saw the return of a team completely decimated and tired after a very long journey but also many injured players for CRB. Mistakes followed against ES Guelma in a late championship match. In two seasons CRB had nothing to put in their trophy cabinet.

Following the appointment of Ahmed Aaran as player-coach, Chabab started regaining form and began to win. In 1968–1969 season they obtained big key wins against NAHD (7–1 and 5–2).

1969–1970: The Triple
The CRB made their first hat-trick in the history of Algerian football and obtained their fourth championship. This was largely in range because it was the best season for CRB who had lost only one match; against MC Oran Oran (3–1) so the championship was won in rather special circumstances. Victories followed in the Algerian Cup final against USM Alger (4–1) and in the Maghreb Club Champions Cup against Sfax (Tunisia). Chabab had passed on entering the African Cup of Champions Clubs after threats of reprisal from Senegalese team Joan of Arc against the CRB following a memorable victory in the first leg at Chabab (5–3) in the Stade El-Annasser.

1970–1971
After four games in the championship with a draw and a win against MC Alger and a defeat against MC Oran and Algerian Cup defeat against CS Constantine on penalties (this ended 48–47 and is the official record Algeria, another one!), the CRB had to win the North African Cup to save their season. This resulted in a win against Tunisia (EST) 3–2 after a great final after crushing and Morocco's FAR in the previous round with a stinging 3–0.

This masterful victory was reported in the famous French sports newspaper the Team and the paper devoted a large space in one of their editions to Chabab Riadhi Belcourt.

1971–1972
It was the beginning of the end of a cycle, and after having started the championship with three great victories against WA Tlemcen (7–0) and JSM Tiaret (8–3) and USM Bel-Abbès (4–1) the team had no more breath and let go, at least on the national scene, as it was still successful in the Cup with a 3rd consecutive win for the Maghreb.

Renewal
The Shabab failed to win titles between 1978 and 1995 despite the good results that made that the team after all the earlier years, ranking each time 2nd, 3rd or 4th until 1988 where the Chabab experienced the worst season in its history characterized by relegation to D2 and an Algerian Cup final loss against USMA on penalties. This was despite the rich who provided a workforce for CRB, and this team was regarded as the best championship team on paper with the Yahi, Amani, Badache, Laamouri, Khoudja, Kabrane, Abdesamia, Kouhil, Demdoum, etc. On the ground though, things were otherwise. However, the ordeal lasted only a single season, as the club returned to the D1 the following year, in 1989.

But the event of relegation did not go without leaving deep scars in the heart of the CRB because Chabab considerably lost its fame to occupy a role in successive championships, even avoiding relegation repeatedly until 1994. In fact, during this year, the Shabab, led by Mourad Abdelouahab was classed as 4th in the championship with the main aim of qualification for the Arabic Cup in Saudi Arabia. It was therefore the following year (1995) that the CRB took part in this competition, where they recorded a respectable run to the semi-final where they were defeated against Espérance de Tunis 0–1.

In 1995, the CRB won the Algerian Cup for the fifth time in its history against the O Medea 2–1.

This was indeed the beginning of another golden age, with a new generation of young and talented players, who despite the change of office (departure and arrival of Lefkir Selmi) and staff by the return of Mourad replacing Abdelouahab of Bacha-Adjaout, a new team, described as an "Algerian dream-team", was born with Bekhti, Badji, Settara, Talis, Bounekdja, Selmi Yacine Chedba Ali Moussa, Boutaleb and others. This developed beautiful football for the CRB and every season new players were brought to the club to complete the tactical approach of the coach and achieve the objectives set by management. It is in this context that players like Mezouar and Boukessassa came to the club.

Players arrived during the 1999–2000 season, which saw Chabab win the title of Champion of Algeria for the 5th time in its history. This also included a victory in the league cup on 19 March 2000, against MC Oran (3–0).

The following season, and its momentum, Chabab not only confirms but does better with a title 2 row from 2000 to 2001 by capping JSK and USMA 7 days of the end of the championship. For the record, the Shabab had won 10 consecutive games with Nour Benzekri happened in the middle of the season.

The dark years
After this season, a real descent into hell began for Chabab starting a free fall due to the unreasonable policy of its new direction. Despite this and a real burst of pride, the CRB still managed to reach the finals of the 2003 Algerian Cup Final. This resulted in a loss due to a scandalous bias in favour of USM Alger by the referee of the meeting (Berber). To illustrate the lawlessness with which the club was run, 17 players from champions Algeria were released in 18 months: a true work of destruction. Given all this, everyone knew that Chabab went straight to ruin. Thus Chabab had their 2 most catastrophic seasons (after 1988), when the club narrowly escaped relegation to D2 twice; in (2003–2004 and 2004–2005). The 2005–2006 season was an average season, despite the backing of no less than 16 players.

2020–present: Consecutive Championships
CR Belouizdad were declared champions of the unfinished 2019–20 season which was halted in March 2020, due to the COVID-19 pandemic in Algeria. Later on, CR Belouizdad managed to win the following 2020–21 and 2021–22 seasons. In the CAF Champions League, CR Belouizdad reached the quarter-finals in both 2020–21 and 2021–22 editions.

 Club identity 

 Colours 
Since the establishment of the club, its colours are the white and the red.

 Crest 
Historical evolution of the club's crest.

 Honours 

Domestic competitionsAlgerian Ligue Professionnelle 1 Winners (9): 1964–65, 1965–66, 1968–69, 1969–70, 1999–2000, 2000–01, 2019–20, 2020–21, 2021–22
 Runners-up (4): 1966–67, 1971–72, 1976–77, 1979–80Algerian Cup Winners (8) – shared record: 1965–66, 1968–69, 1969–70, 1977–78, 1994–95, 2008–09, 2016–17, 2018–19 
 Runners-up (3): 1987–88, 2002–03, 2011–12Algerian League Cup Winners (1): 1999–2000Algerian Super Cup Winners (2): 1995, 2019

Regional competitionsMaghreb Champions Cup Winners (3): 1970, 1971, 1972
 Runners-up: 1973

Performance in CAF competitions

Players
Algerian teams are limited to two foreign players. The squad list includes only the principal nationality of each player;

Current squad
As of 5 February 2023.

Reserve Squad

Out on loan

Personnel
Current technical staff

 Former personnel 

 Club presidents 

Notable players
Below are the notable former players who have represented CR Belouizdad' in league and international competition since the club's foundation in 1962. To appear in the section below, a player must have played in at least 100 official matches for the club or represented the national team for which the player is eligible during his stint with CR Belouizdad or following his departure.For a complete list of CR Belouizdad players, see :Category:CR Belouizdad playersAlgeria
 Mohamed Abrouk
 Ishak Ali Moussa
 Fayçal Badji
 Hocine Benmiloudi
 Nassim Bounekdja
 Mustapha Dahleb
 Bouazza Feham
 Samir Hadjaoui
 Salem Harcheche
 Mokhtar Khalem
 Mustapha Kouici
 Abdelkader Laïfaoui

Algeria
 Hacène Lalmas
 Kheïreddine Madoui
 Abdelkrim Mameri
 Djamel Menad
 Brahim Arafat Mezouar
 Noureddine Neggazi
 Mohamed Ousserir
  Djilali Selmi
 Islam Slimani
 Mohamed Talis
 Djamel Tlemçani
 Hocine Yahi

Africa
 Bruno Hameni Njeukam
 Alain Nebié
 Mouhoubé Alex Somian
 Jean Louis Pascal Angan
 Mohamed Aoudou Golanne
 Gilles Ngomo Michée
 François Obélé
Sherrif Deen
 Onome Sympson Sodje
 Bogy
 Soumaila Sidibe
 Mohamed Thiam
 Boubacar Soumana Hainikoye

Europe
 Miloš Galin

Managers list

  Yahia Saadi (?  – ?)
  Ahmed Zitoun (1 July 1964 – 30 June 1966)
  Ahmed Arab (1 July 1967 – 30 June 1969)
  Hacène Lalmas (1 July 1969 – 30 June 1970)
  Ali Benfadah (1 July 1973 – 30 June 1974)
  Dušan Uhrin (1 July 1977 – 30 June 1978)
  Ahmed Arab (1 July 1977  – 30 June 1978)
 ???
  Abdelhamid Bacha (?  – ?)
  Mustapha Heddane (?  – ?)
  Chérif Adjaout (?  – ?)
  Mourad Abdelouahab (?  – ?)
  Nour Benzekri (?  – ?)
  Kamel Mouassa (1 July 2002 – 28 January 2003)
  Abdelhamid Bacha (29 January 2003 – 3 September 2003)
  Noureddine Neggazi (interim) (4 September 2003 – 18 September 2003)
  Abdelkader Soltani (19 September 2003 – 10 February 2004)
  Noureddine Neggazi (interim) (11 February 2004 – 3 March 2004)
  Milisav Bogdanovic (4 March 2004 – 9 March 2004)
  Noureddine Neggazi (interim) (10 March 2004 – 18 May 2004)
  Djamel Amani (interim) (19 May 2004 – 30 June 2004)
  Mourad Abdelouahab (1 July 2004 – 23 October 2004)
  Djamel Amani (interim) (23 February 2005 – 3 March 2005)
  Azzedine Aït Djoudi (4 March 2005 – 31 May 2005)
  Abdelhak Benchikha (1 June 2005 – 30 June 2006)
 ???
  Mohamed Henkouche (1 July 2008 – 3 October 2009)
  Karim Bouhila (interim) (4 October 2009 – 24 December 2009)
  Mohamed Henkouche (25 December 2009 – 30 June 2010)
  Miguel Angel Gamondi (4 July 2010 – 30 June 2011)
  Giovanni Solinas (1 July 2011 – 22 November 2011)
  Djamel Menad (23 November 2011 – 30 June 2012)
  Guglielmo Arena (1 July 2012 – 23 October 2012)
  Fouad Bouali (3 November 2012 – 15 June 2013)
  Miguel Angel Gamondi (20 June 2013 – 1 January 2014)
  Abdelkader Yaïche (6 January 2014 – 23 February 2014)
  Mohamed Henkouche (24 February 2014 – 30 June 2014)
  Victor Zvunka (1 July 2014 – 20 October 2014)
  Alain Michel (29 October 2014 – 30 June 2016)
  Fouad Bouali (1 July 2016 – 29 August 2016)
  Alain Michel (19 September 2016 – 24 October 2016)
  Ezzaki Badou (13 November 2016 – 7 July 2017)
  Ivica Todorov (21 July 2017 – 25 December 2017)
  Rachid Taoussi (28 December 2017 – 30 May 2018)
  Tahar Chérif El-Ouazzani (26 July 2018 – 7 October 2018)
  Lotfi Amrouche (interim)'' (8 October 2018 – 2 December 2018)
  Abdelkader Amrani (3 December 2018 – 28 December 2019)
  Franck Dumas (13 January 2020 – 30 March 2021)
  Zoran Manojlović (20 April 2021 – 31 August 2021)
  Marcos Paquetá (23 September 2021 –26 June 2022)
  Nabil Kouki (4 July 2022 –)

Rival clubs
  MC Alger (Derby)
  USM Alger (Derby)
  MC Oran (Rivalry)
  ES Sétif (Rivalry)
   ES Tunis (Rivalry)

References

External links

 
Football clubs in Algeria
Association football clubs established in 1962
Football clubs in Algiers
Algerian Ligue Professionnelle 1 clubs
1962 establishments in Algeria
Sports clubs in Algeria